Carol Hall is a Republican member of the Connecticut House of Representatives. She represents District 59.

References 

Living people
Republican Party members of the Connecticut House of Representatives
Women state legislators in Connecticut
21st-century American politicians
21st-century American women politicians
Year of birth missing (living people)